was a Japanese political activist, mathematics lecturer and critic. He also wrote books under the name . He was chair of mathematics at the correspondence-course "Z-kai", and taught at the three top exam preparation schools (juku): Yoyogi Seminar, Sundai Preparatory School and Kawai Juku Groupwork.

Career
For many years, he was responsible for the "basic mathematics seminar" at Yoyogi exam preparation school. He was a lecturer in Oubun-Sha company's "University entrance exam radio". Oubun-Sha was  the author of the "fundamental issues lecture" and "standard issue lecture" series and the author of "training" series of the Zoushin-kai Publishing House, such as Aleph's "Calculus Lab".

He gave counseling to young people, including homeless youth.

Personal life
He graduated from the Department of Engineering of the University of Tokyo.

Haji graduated from the kyu-sei-ichi-koukou (currently, University of Tokyo liberal arts).

In his youth he suffered from tuberculosis and recovered but sometimes had hoarseness or cough.

He is buried in Aoyama cemetery in Minato-ku, Tokyo.

Haji was involved in the "Peace to Vietnam" committee.

Publications
Masao Haji. "Han-sugaku-riron" (Futohsha, 1977) ISBN B000J8S3KC 
Masao Haji. "Koukou-muyou-no-Daigaku-Shingaku-Hou" (Sanichi-syobou, 1983) ISBN B000J7BLYS
Masao Haji. "Sugaku1 Hyoujun-Mondai-seikou" (Oubun-sha, 1985) 
Masao Haji. "Kisokaiseki-hyoujyun-mondai-seikou" (Oubun-sha, 1996)

References

External links
Memorial texts collection of works from "44fragments of the surrounding Mr. Haji masao." By Yuichi Yoshikawa  (in Japanese)
"Meeting in memory of Mr. Haji masao." success. Facsimile edition of the book also 05 / July / 99 (in Japanese)

1925 births
1998 deaths
Japanese educators
20th-century Japanese mathematicians
Japanese activists
University of Tokyo alumni